"Epitaph" is the third track on British progressive rock band King Crimson's 1969 album In the Court of the Crimson King. It was written by Robert Fripp, Ian McDonald, Greg Lake, and Michael Giles with lyrics written by Peter Sinfield.

The song is noted for its heavy use of the Mellotron,. As with the album's first track, "21st Century Schizoid Man", the song's lyrics have a distinctly dystopian feel to them and are presented as a protest to the Cold War.

The song's title was used as the name for a live album of recordings done by the original King Crimson, Epitaph.

Emerson, Lake & Palmer would later incorporate an excerpt from this song after the "Battlefield" portion of the live version of their song "Tarkus", from the Tarkus album, as documented in the live album Welcome Back My Friends to the Show That Never Ends... Ladies and Gentlemen.

"Stripes" from Cage's album Hell's Winter samples a middle part of the song throughout its duration.

Epitaph Records also took its name from the song.

Track listing
In 1976, "Epitaph" was released as a single with "21st Century Schizoid Man" as the B-side, a companion to the compilation A Young Person's Guide to King Crimson (1976).

 "Epitaph" (including "March for No Reason" and "Tomorrow and Tomorrow") (Robert Fripp, Michael Giles, Greg Lake, Ian McDonald, Peter Sinfield)
 "21st Century Schizoid Man" (including "Mirrors") (Fripp, Giles, Lake, McDonald, Sinfield)

Personnel
 Robert Fripp – acoustic guitar, electric guitar
 Greg Lake – bass guitar, vocals
 Ian McDonald – Mellotron, harpsichord, piano, flute, organ, clarinet, bass clarinet
 Michael Giles – drums, percussion, timpani
 Peter Sinfield – lyrics

References

Sources

External links
 Official King Crimson's record label

1969 songs
1976 singles
King Crimson songs
Rock ballads
Songs with lyrics by Peter Sinfield
Songs written by Robert Fripp
Songs written by Ian McDonald (musician)
Songs written by Greg Lake
Songs written by Michael Giles
Song recordings produced by Greg Lake
Folk rock songs
Symphonic rock songs
Atlantic Records singles
Song recordings produced by Ian McDonald (musician)